Malaysian Pakistani or Pakistani Malaysian may refer to:
Malaysia-Pakistan relations
Malaysians in Pakistan
Pakistanis in Malaysia
Mixed race individuals of Malaysian and Pakistani descent
Multiple citizenship of Malaysia and Pakistan